S92 or S-92 may refer to:

Aircraft 
 Avia S-92, a Czechoslovak fighter aircraft
 Blériot-SPAD S.92, a French biplane trainer
 Sikorsky S-92, an American helicopter
 SIPA S.92, a French trainer

Other uses 
 S92 (Long Island bus)
 S92 (New York City bus) serving Staten Island
 Daihatsu Zebra (S92), a pickup truck and van
 , a submarine of the Royal Navy
 S92 Luoyang–Lushi Expressway, China